Diego Angulo Iñiguez (July 18, 1901 – October 5, 1986) was an art historian, a university professor, writer and Director of the Prado Museum in Madrid from 1968 to 1970.

Complementing his career as a curator an academic, he served as one of the founding members of the Art advisory council of the International Foundation for Art Research   (IFAR).

Select works
In a statistical overview derived from writings by and about Diego Angulo Iñiguez, OCLC/WorldCat encompasses roughly 300+ works in 600+5 publications in 7 languages and 3,400+ library holdings.

 Historia del arte hispano-americano (1945)
 Historia del arte (1953) 
 Pintura del renacimiento (1954)
 Juan de Borgoña by Juan de Borgoña (1954)
 José Antolínez (1957)
 Historia de la pintura española (1969)
 Retablo barroco : a la memoria de Francisco de la Maza (1974)
 A corpus of Spanish drawings (1975)
 Spanish drawings, 1400–1600 (1975) 
 Murillo (1981)

Notes

References
  Angulo Íñiguez, Diego -  Dictionary of Art Historians
  Angulo Íñiguez, Diego, Enciclopedia Online (Museo del Prado)
  Diego Angulo Íñiguez Biografías y Vidas
 Gómez, Isabel Mateo. (2001). Diego Angulo Íñiguez, historiador del arte. Madrid :Consejo  Superior de Investigaciones Científicas. ;  OCLC 50040478

External links 
Necrológica de Diego Angulo Íñiguez - Biblioteca virtual Miguel de Cervantes
Biografía de Diego Angulo Íñiguez - El País
Obras de Diego Angulo Íñiguez - La Biblioteca Abierta

1901 births
1986 deaths
Spanish art historians
Spanish art curators
Directors of the Museo del Prado
Spanish art critics
Spanish architectural historians
20th-century Spanish historians